The Netherlands A cricket team toured Ireland in May 2021 to play three unofficial One Day International matches (with List A status) against the Ireland Wolves cricket team. The fixtures of the tour were confirmed by Cricket Ireland on 22 April 2021, with all the three unofficial ODI matches being played at Oak Hill on 10, 12 and 13 May. 

The bilateral series was originally used for both teams as the preparation for the World Cup Super League matches between the two sides which was held in June 2021.

On 4 May 2021, the Royal Dutch Cricket Association announced a 14-man squad for the series, with Scott Edwards as the captain. While the next day, Cricket Ireland also confirmed the squads for Ireland Wolves, with Harry Tector named as the captain.

Squads

Series summary 
Ireland Wolves started their home series with a 94 runs win as Shane Getkate's 74 runs off just 40 balls guided the Wolves to secure 276 runs in 50 overs. In response, Netherlands A could not sustain a partnership as they started to regularly lose wickets in the early overs, with Craig Young the best bowler by the Wolves, who bagged 2 wickets conceding 37 runs.

While in the following match, Netherlands A fought back to level the series, as the low aggregate match ended with Dutch A side's victory by 5 wickets while chasing 95. Vivian Kingma's economic three wicket haul for just 5 runs and the consistent figures of other Dutch bowlers never allowed the Irish batters to settle in the innings.

In the final match, Ireland Wolves won by 5 wickets to claim the series 2–1. This time, Netherlands A had a disappointing first innings as Graeme McCarter claimed 6 for 32 to star in the Wolves' victory.

List A series

1st Unofficial ODI

2nd Unofficial ODI

3rd Unofficial ODI

See also 

 Ireland Wolves cricket team in Bangladesh in 2020–21

References

External links 
Series home at ESPNcricinfo

A team cricket
2021 in Irish cricket
2021 in Dutch cricket